Sidney Redner (born 1951) is a Canadian-born physicist, professor, and a resident faculty member at the Santa Fe Institute.  He was formerly department chair of physics at Boston University.  Redner has published over 200 journal articles, authored a book titled A Guide to First-Passage Processes (2001), and coauthored a book titled A Kinetic View of Statistical Physics (2010) with Pavel L. Krapivsky and Eli Ben-Naim.  His research focuses mainly on non-equilibrium statistical mechanics and network structure.  He received his Ph.D. in physics from the Massachusetts Institute of Technology in 1977 under Gene Stanley, also on faculty at Boston University.

He was awarded the American Physical Society's Leo P. Kadanoff Prize for 2021.

References

External links
 Faculty page at BU.
 Personal Web site.

1951 births
Living people
Jewish American scientists
Boston University faculty
MIT Department of Physics alumni
Probability theorists
21st-century American physicists
Santa Fe Institute people
21st-century American Jews
Statistical physicists
Fellows of the American Physical Society